The Cassard expedition was a sea voyage by French Navy captain Jacques Cassard in 1712, during the War of the Spanish Succession. Targeting English, Dutch, and Portuguese possessions, he raided and ransomed the colonies of Cape Verde, Sint Eustatius, and Curaçao—factories, depots, and seasoning camps used in the Atlantic slave trade. He also raided and ransomed Montserrat, Antigua, Surinam, Berbice, and Essequibo—wealthy sugar-producing colonies in the Caribbean whose economies were based on the exploitation of slave labor.

In many of the places he landed, officials paid a ransom to avoid pillage; this was not always successful, as Cassard sometimes ignored the terms of the agreements he made. At the end of its expedition, Cassard's squadron returned to France with prizes in the form of cash, goods, and enslaved Africans worth between nine and ten million French livres. Cassard's exploits won him the Order of Saint Louis. Effects on the fortifications, enslaved populations, and profitability of the targeted colonies continued well into the rest of the 18th century.

Expedition
On December 2, 1711, Cassard received command of a squadron of three ships of the line and five frigates from the king. Departing in early March 1712 from the port of Toulon with a fleet of eight ships, 3,000 seamen, and 1,200 soldiers, he embarked on an expedition during which he raided English, Dutch, and Portuguese colonies at Cape Verde and in the Caribbean. Over the course of twenty-seven months, Cassard also raided enemy fleets for ransom.

Portuguese and English colonies
Among his most notable seizures was the Portuguese capital on the island of Santiago at Cape Verde:

After crossing the Atlantic, the squadron stopped at Martinique for resupply, and to unload the plunder taken at Cape Verde. The freebooters of Saint-Domingue, who hadn't forgotten Cassard's actions during the Raid on Cartagena, came to meet him and requested to join the expedition. Now at the head of a small fleet, he sacked the English islands of Montserrat and Antigua before heading to Dutch Guiana.

Dutch Guiana and Sint Eustatius
Cassard started his Dutch colonial raids in Surinam, which he besieged, captured, and ransomed.

On October 10, 1712, he landed a portion of his force near the plantation Meerzorg across the Suriname River from Paramaribo, the Surinamese capital. From here, he bombarded the city and neighboring Fort Zeelandia in support of an amphibious assault. On the 27th, he departed the colony after securing a promise from the governor for delivery of a ransom consisting of enslaved people, goods, and cash valued at 2.4m French livres, or 747,350 Dutch guilders, equivalent to a full year's production in the colony, or €8.1m in 2018.

The following month, Cassard turned to Berbice, briefly occupying the colony. The descendants of Abraham van Peere, the Dutch colony's founder, did not want to pay a ransom to the French to free the colony, which as a result ceded to French control.

After having also sacked Essequibo, yet another colony in Dutch Guiana, Cassard returned again to Martinique to deposit his latest prizes. He did not stay long, setting sail for the island of Sint Eustatius, also colonized by the Dutch. He ransomed this colony in the same way as he had the Dutch landward settlements.

Curaçao
Finally, Cassard returned to Surinam to collect his ransom in Paramaribo and then headed toward Curaçao. In 1678, the well-defended island had successfully avoided invasion by a larger fleet led by Jean II d'Estrées that foundered on the Las Aves archipelago. According to a French source, Cassard overcame his officers' objections with a demonstration of his preferred method of attack, and also because Curaçao was richer and more significant than the other colonies already raided—this despite the fact that the official ransom demanded and received in Curaçao was only 600,000 livres, though this may have been supplemented by plunder. Cassard himself was injured in this phase of the expedition.

The Cassard expedition to Cape Verde and the Caribbean was successful, and after another stopover at Martinique, Cassard returned to France with prizes in the form of cash, goods, and enslaved Africans whose net value was estimated at nine to ten million livres.

Aftermath

France
Thanks to his exploits, Jacques Cassard was named Knight of the Order of Saint Louis on his return to France. From 1713, he focused his efforts on lawsuits relating to the plunder. Eleven ships of the French Navy have been named for him.

Cape Verde
In Cape Verde, Ribiera Grande was slowly replaced as capital of the Portuguese colony by Praia, due to the latter settlement's strategic position farther east and on a plateau, giving it better natural protection against pirate attacks. This move, initially ordered by King Philip II of Portugal on August 14, 1712, was implemented gradually, and not complete until 1770.

Antilles
In the Americas, the 1713 Peace of Utrecht, which shrank navies as it ended the War of the Spanish Succession, put a temporary end to the privations of French corsairs and large-scale naval raids fortified by freebooters like the Cassard expedition, capable of sacking even the largest colonies. As a result, there was a resurgence in the Golden Age of Piracy as "fully illegal" independent pirate captains took on unemployed sailors and focused on commerce raiding and smuggling.

Berbice
An Amsterdam-based consortium consisting of the brothers Nicolaas and Hendrik van Hoorn, Arnold Dix, Pieter Schuurmans, and Cornelis van Peere paid the ransom of ƒ180,000 in cash and ƒ120,000 in sugar and enslaved people on October 24, 1714, thereby returning Berbice to Dutch control, and acquiring the colony for themselves. In 1720, the colony's five new owners founded the Society of Berbice, akin to the Society of Suriname which governed the neighbouring colony, to raise more capital for the colony. The Society was a public company listed on the Amsterdam Stock Exchange. While economic activity in Berbice now increased as compared to the Van Peere years, the Society of Berbice paid smaller Dividends than similar corporations, and continued underinvestment led to supply shortages which, when exacerbated by the Seven Years' War, led to hunger among the enslaved population, a contributing factor to the 1763 Berbice slave uprising.

Surinam
There was an uptick in marronage in Surinam during the period of Cassard's expedition. Some plantations let their enslaved population enter the forests to avoid capture, an opportunity some took not to return. Other Africans escaped almost immediately after disembarking in the colony, joining bands of Maroons in the interior. Escapees from plantation Vreedenburg and escapees from recently-landed Slave ships joined the Saamaka Maroons who eventually settled on the Upper Suriname River and made peace with the colonial government in 1762. They preserve the memory of their ancestors' escape in their oral history.

In 1715, Fort Sommelsdijk was strengthened to protect plantations in the region. The fort was located up the Commewijne River (itself the Suriname River's northernmost tributary) at the mouth of the Cottica. As there was still need to further fortify Paramaribo, which had never successfully repelled an invasion, it was decided to build another fort closer to Meerzorg above the confluence of the Suriname and the Commewijne. Fort Nieuw-Amsterdam was finished in 1747, and Fort Sommelsdijk was downgraded to an outpost.

The effort entailed in provisioning and financing the ransom demanded by Cassard was a heavy burden on the Sephardic Jewish community of Surinam, which owned a third of the colony's plantations in the early eighteenth century. As such, it was a contributing factor to the century-long decline of plantations with Jewish owners, who slowly relocated the seat of their operations from Jodensavanne to Paramaribo, where they integrated more closely with the rest of the colony's European population. In the early 19th century, the remains of Jodensavanne were destroyed in a Maroon raid.

Notes

References

Bibliography

 

 
 

History of the Caribbean
Conflicts in 1712
18th century in Cape Verde
History of Santiago, Cape Verde
History of Montserrat
History of British Antigua and Barbuda
History of the Netherlands Antilles
History of Curaçao
History of Sint Eustatius
History of Suriname
History of Guyana
Battles of the War of the Spanish Succession
Battles involving France
Battles involving Great Britain
Battles involving Portugal
Battles involving the Netherlands
Wars involving Guyana
Wars involving Suriname
European colonization of the Americas
1712 in Africa
1712 in the Caribbean
1712 in South America
1713 in the Caribbean
1713 in South America
Conflicts in 1713
1712 in France
1713 in France
1712 in the British Empire
British Guiana